Yuanfeng was a Chinese era name used by several emperors of China. It may refer to:

Yuanfeng (元封, 110BC–105BC), an era name used by Emperor Wu of Han
Yuanfeng (元鳳, 80BC–75BC), an era name used by Emperor Zhao of Han
Yuanfeng (元豐, 1078–1085), an era name used by Emperor Shenzong of Song